Hendrina is a town in Nkangala District Municipality, in the Mpumalanga province of South Africa. The town is 53 km (32.9 mi) northwest of Ermelo, 40 km (24.8 mi) southwest of Carolina, and 53 km (32.9 mi) southeast of Middelburg.

History
Hendrina was established in 1914 on Garsfontein Farm and named after Hendrina Beukes, wife of Gert Beukes, who first owned the farm. It was administered by a health committee and village council from 1919 to 1926.

Economy
Hendrina's main economic activities are coal mining and diversified farming (of beans, potatoes, and maize). It is the location of two of the largest power stations operated by South African public utility company Eskom: Arnot Power Station and Hendrina Power Station.

Sources
 Erasmus, B.P.J. (1995). Op Pad in Suid-Afrika. New York: Jonathan Ball Publishers. .
 Rosenthal, Eric (1967). Ensiklopedie van Suidelike Afrika. Cape Town/Johannesburg: Juta.
http://www.mpumalanga.com/places-to-go/grass-wetlands/hendrina

References

Populated places in the Steve Tshwete Local Municipality
Populated places established in 1914